The Nanking Safety Zone (Nankin Anzenku, or , Nankin Anzenchitai) was a demilitarized zone for Chinese civilians set up on the eve of the Japanese breakthrough in the Battle of Nanking (December 13, 1937). Following the example of Jesuit Father Robert Jacquinot de Besange in Shanghai, the foreigners in Nanjing (also known as Nanking) created the Nanking Safety Zone, managed by the International Committee for the Nanjing Safety Zone led by German businessman and Nazi party member, John Rabe. The zone and the activities of the International Committee were responsible for safely harboring 250,000 Chinese civilians from death and violence during the Nanjing Massacre.

Evacuation of Nanjing 
Many Westerners were living in the city at that time, conducting trade or on missionary trips. As the Japanese army began to approach Nanjing, the Chinese government departed, moving to the transitional capital of Hankow. Most of the foreigners in Nanjing fled the city as well. However, a small number of Westerners chose to remain behind. It is not clear exactly how many Westerners stayed behind and who they were. The number reported ranges from 20 to 30. David Askew has analyzed various sources who provide differing numbers of foreigners remaining in the city on different dates. According to Askew, the best estimate seems to be that there were 27 foreigners in the city, five of whom were journalists who left the city on December 16, a few days after it fell to the Japanese army.

Other than these five journalists, the other Westerners who remained in Nanjing were businessmen, physicians and missionaries. Almost all of these were members of either the International Committee for the Nanking Safety Zone or the International Red Cross Committee of Nanking.

Establishment
The Westerners who remained behind established the Nanjing Safety Zone, which was composed of a score of refugee camps that occupied an area of about 3.4 miles2 (8.6 km2). The Safety Zone was bordered by roads on all four sides, and had an area of approximately 3.86 km2, with 25 refugee camps centered around the U.S. Embassy.

To coordinate their efforts, the Westerners formed a committee, called the International Committee for the Nanking Safety Zone. German businessman John Rabe was elected as its leader, partly because of his status as a member of the Nazi party and the existence of the German-Japanese bilateral Anti-Comintern Pact. The International Committee for the Nanking Safety Zone was formed on November 22, 1937.

Recognition
The City of Nanjing affirmed the existence of the Safety Zone, sent cash and food, and staffed security personnel in the zone. On December 1, 1937, the mayor of Nanjing, Ma Chao-chun, ordered all Chinese citizens remaining in Nanjing to move into the "Safety Zone" and then fled the city.

The Japanese army did not recognize its existence, but they agreed not to attack parts of the city that did not contain Chinese military forces. The members of the International Committee for the Nanking Safety Zone managed to persuade the Chinese government to move all their troops out of the area.

According to Miner Searle Bates, one of the American missionaries, "The Chinese authorities agreed to the idea of the Zone, though the military were naturally reluctant to move out of the area before the very last minute." Bates described the Japanese position on the Safety Zone in this way, "The Japanese authorities never formally recognized the Zone, but did say that they would not attack an area which was not occupied by Chinese troops. On this narrow margin of agreement, the Chinese promise to evacuate the area and the Japanese statement that they would not intentionally attack an unoccupied place, the Safety Zone was finally put through."

The Japanese army did not subject the Safety Zone to concentrated air bombardment or shelling. Only a few shells landed in the Zone throughout the siege, which wounded about 40 refugees.

Atrocities committed by the Imperial Japanese Army

The Japanese did respect the Zone to an extent; no shells entered that part of the city leading up to the Japanese occupation except a few stray shots. During the chaos following the attack of the city, some were killed in the Safety Zone, but the atrocities in the rest of the city were far greater by all accounts.

Japanese soldiers committed atrocities in the Safety Zone that were part of the much larger Nanjing Massacre. The International Committee appealed a number of times to the Japanese army, with John Rabe using his credentials as a Nazi Party member, but to no avail. From time to time, the Japanese would forcefully enter the Safety Zone, carry off a few hundred men and women, and either summarily execute them or rape and then kill them. The Japanese army claimed that there were guerrillas in the Safety Zone due to the fact that anyone not wearing a uniform could enter.

End
In late January 1938, the Japanese army forced all refugees in the Safety Zone to return home, and claimed to have "restored order". On February 18, 1938, the Nanking Safety Zone International Committee was forcibly renamed "Nanking International Rescue Committee", and the Safety Zone effectively ceased to function. The last refugee camps were closed in May 1938. John Rabe and his International Committee were credited with saving 200,000–250,000 lives despite the ongoing massacre. 

After George Ashmore Fitch departed, Hubert Lafayette Sone was elected Administrative Director of the Nanking International Relief Committee.

Legacy
Before the normalization of relations between China and the West, the Westerners who remained behind in Nanjing to run the Nanking Safety Zone were vigorously criticized by the Chinese government. For example, a group of researchers at Nanjing University in the 1960s condemned the members of the Western community in Nanjing for turning a blind eye to the Japanese atrocities in the city and misused the primary sources to suggest that the Westerners had cooperated in the Japanese slaughter of Chinese. As Chinese concerns about "American imperialism" diminished, and as Japan became the target of official vitriol (partly at least because of the highly politicized and contentious issue of Japanese textbooks), views in China dramatically changed. Westerners were now depicted as active resistors rather than active collaborators.

However, certain right-wing and nationalist Japanese authors and politicians claim that along with the Nanjing massacre, the Safety Zone never existed. The museum of the Yasukuni shrine omits any mention of the Nanjing massacre and proclaims that "The Japanese established a safety zone for Chinese civilians and made a special effort to protect historical and cultural sites. Inside the city, residents were once again able to live their lives in peace."

See also
 George Ashmore Fitch
 Minnie Vautrin
 Shanghai Ghetto
 Nanking (1937－1945)

Notes

Sources
 Rabe, John, The Good Man of Nanking: The Diaries of John Rabe, Vintage (Paper), 2000. 
 Vautrin, Wilhemina, Minnie Vautrin Papers. Special Collection, Yale Divinity School Library, Record Group No. 8 and No. 11.
 Online Documentary – the Nanking Atrocities, 2000. <https://web.archive.org/web/20070928163836/http://www.nankingatrocities.net/Table/table.htm>

Further reading
 Timothy, Brooks, ed. Documents on the Rape of Nanking, The University of Michigan Press, 2002. (includes a reprint of "Hsu, Shuhsi, Documents of the Nanking Safety Zone, Kelly and Walsh, 1939".)
Zhang, Kaiyuan, ed. Eyewitnesses to Massacre, An East Gate Book, 2001. (includes documentation of American missionaries; M.S. Bates, George Ashmore Fitch, E.H. Foster, J.G. Magee, J.H. MaCallum, W.P. Mills, L.S.C. Smyth, A.N. Steward, Minnie Vautrin and R.O. Wilson.)  (Google Books version)

Nanjing Massacre
Rescue of Chinese in the Nanjing Massacre